Blackpool Pleasure Beach Express is a  narrow gauge railway, built in 1933 as a tourist attraction at Pleasure Beach Blackpool, Lancashire.

History

The main station was built in 1933, but was destroyed by fire in 1934. Redesigned by architect Joseph Emberton and rebuilt in 1935, it was replaced in 1970 by the present Victorian style building.

Operation

The line has two stations, Pleasure Beach Express station and Star Halt. The latter is now a request stop.

The train now runs in the opposite direction to how it did originally. The animal statues and figures are all facing the wrong way, and if you look back on the tunnel mouths, there are various signs indicating the direction the train used to travel. Sometimes the railway runs backwards to give a different view of the line.

Diesel locomotives

The original two locomotives were supplied in 1933 and were named Mary Louise and Carol Jean after the daughters of the park owner, Leonard Thompson. The third was to be named William Geoffrey after his son, but a royal visit to the factory building it prompted a change to Princess Royal. It was renamed to Geoffrey Thompson OBE in his honour after his death in 2004. All three were built by Hudswell Clarke in Hunslet, Leeds, who had also supplied locomotives for Scarborough North Bay Railway and Golden Acre Park, Leeds. They went on to build two more 4-6-2 class locomotives for Billy Butlin to use at the Empire Exhibition in Glasgow in 1938.

References

External links
Postcards of the Pleasure Beach Express from 1933 onwards

Blackpool Pleasure Beach
21 in gauge railways in England
Miniature railways in the United Kingdom